Borhyaena is an extinct genus of South American metatherian, living between 17.5 and 15.5 million years ago in Patagonia, Argentina (Santa Cruz and Sarmiento Formations) and Chile (Río Frias Formation).

Description
Borhyaena was a predator and had a large head and a long, powerful neck similar to living hyenas. Its legs were cursorial, albeit less specialized than those of wolves or the marsupial thylacine.

References

External links

Sparassodonts
Miocene mammals of South America
Friasian
Santacrucian
Colhuehuapian
Neogene Argentina
Fossils of Argentina
Neogene Chile
Fossils of Chile
Fossil taxa described in 1887
Taxa named by Florentino Ameghino
Prehistoric mammal genera
Golfo San Jorge Basin
Sarmiento Formation